Jeffrey Carl "Jeff" Blatnick (July 26, 1957 – October 24, 2012) was an American super heavyweight Greco-Roman wrestler and sports commentator. He won NCAA Division II heavyweight wrestling championships in 1978 and 1979 and won the Olympic gold medal in Greco-Roman wrestling in 1984 after battling back from cancer. During his wrestling days, he and Dan Severn were in the same U.S. National Wrestling Team.

As a commentator, Blatnick worked UFC 4 through UFC 32 for the Ultimate Fighting Championship. He also served as the UFC commissioner and was instrumental in helping the UFC get regulated by the athletic commissions, which kept the sport of mixed martial arts alive during its dark ages in the United States at the time. Blatnick is among the people credited with giving the sport of mixed martial arts its name.

He was born in Niskayuna, New York, and was most recently an MMA judge for the New Jersey athletic commission.

Wrestling 
Blatnick began his career wrestling in 1973 at Niskayuna High School in Niskayuna, New York. While wrestling for Niskayuna, Blatnick became the state heavyweight champion in 1975. After graduating from Niskayuna, he attended and wrestled for Springfield College in Springfield, Massachusetts, where he was a three-time All-American. After winning national titles in NCAA Division II, he qualified for the 1980 Olympic team, but did not get a chance to compete because the USA boycotted the games. In 1982, he was diagnosed with Hodgkin's lymphoma, prompting the removal of his spleen and appendix.

After radiation therapy helped to hold the cancer in remission, Blatnick competed in and won a gold medal in the 1984 Olympic Games in Los Angeles, California. He and his teammate Steve Fraser were the first Americans to ever win gold in Olympic Greco-Roman wrestling history. Blatnick retired from wrestling after a second round with cancer, which required chemotherapy. He served as a television commentator during the 1988 Summer Olympics.

Blatnick was inducted as a Distinguished Member of the National Wrestling Hall of Fame in 1999. He served on the board of wrestlers for USA wrestling and was also a commentator for the NCAA Division I wrestling championships.

Mixed martial arts 
From 1994 to 2001 for UFC 4 to UFC 32, Blatnick served as a commentator for the Ultimate Fighting Championship, and was officially named as the commissioner of the UFC during UFC 17. During this time he was involved in the development of the modern rules of the sport. Bob Meyrowitz, the original owner of the UFC, tasked Blatnick to push the sport forward. With help from referee John McCarthy and then UFC matchmaker Joe Silva, Blatnick created a manual of policies, procedures, codes of conduct and rules, many of which exist to this day. He traveled around the country, educating regulators and changing perceptions about a sport that was thought to be bloodthirsty and inhumane.

By April 2000, Blatnick's efforts had clearly made an impact. California was set to become the first state in the U.S. to sign off on a set of codified rules that governed MMA. Soon after, New Jersey adopted the language. He sat cageside in Atlantic City months later, when UFC held its first event regulated under the unified rules, headlined fittingly by two outstanding wrestlers, Kevin Randleman and Blatnick's favorite fighter, Randy Couture. Blatnick's contributions to the sport of mixed martial arts helped keep the sport alive during its darkest period and helped pave the way for the sport to flourish later in the decade.

Blatnick has also been credited with giving the sport of mixed martial arts its name. Nick Lembo, the man who runs the New Jersey athletic control board, wrote, "(Jeff) would urge people to stop calling the sport No Holds Barred, in order to help it grow and gain acceptance." Dave Meltzer added, "No Holds Barred, (Blatnick) said, gave people a bad connotation of what it was, and felt it was a negative. Mixed Martial Arts, the idea of combining techniques from all the various martial arts forms with that of wrestling, was really what the sport was, he would say."

Blatnick authored the Mixed Martial Arts Council Manual and was also licensed as a referee and judge with the New Jersey commission.

A petition was also started on the MMA Underground forum by UFC fighter Shane Carwin for Blatnick to be inducted into the  UFC Hall of Fame for his contributions to the organization.

On May 20, 2015, it was announced that Blatnick would be inducted into the new contributors wing of the UFC Hall of Fame for his contributions to the sport and organization. On July 11, 2015, at the UFC Hall of Fame event in Las Vegas his widow, Lori, accepted the award on Blatnick's behalf.

Death and legacy 
Blatnick died on October 24, 2012, as a result of complications from heart surgery. His death sent shock waves through both MMA and wrestling, and resulted in massive outpouring from fans and media in remembrance of Blatnick's life. At the time of his death, Blatnick was a varsity wrestling coach at Burnt Hills-Ballston Lake High School, and also worked as a motivational speaker. He lived with his wife Lori, son Ian, and daughter Niki in Clifton Park, New York.

Frank Shamrock called Blatnick "one of the original soldiers of MMA"; longtime UFC referee John McCarthy said, "Jeff deserves so much credit for helping establish MMA. He gave his credibility to our sport we all owe him a debt of gratitude." MMA fighter and SiriusXM radio host R. J. Clifford wrote, "Jeff Blatnick was so genuine. Seconds after becoming the first US greco medalist, he spent his interview thanking others. Most importantly, (he was) a great human being. Secondly, (he was) one of the best guys to help fix MMA judging...What a loss to both wrestling and MMA."

A municipal park in Niskayuna, New York, is named after Blatnick. Blatnick Park contains several baseball and softball fields, an 18 hole disc golf course, a pavilion and picnic area, and a small section of the Mohawk Hudson Hike/Bike Trail.

References

External links
 Jeff Blatnick at United World Wrestling Database
 Blatnick's bio at Hickok Sports
 National Wrestling Hall of Fame and Museum entry
 BloodyElbow.com
 ZimBio.com
 Town of Niskayuna, NY: Blatnick Park

1957 births
2012 deaths
American motivational speakers
Sportspeople from Schenectady, New York
Wrestlers at the 1984 Summer Olympics
American male sport wrestlers
Mixed martial arts broadcasters
American people of Slovenian descent
Springfield College (Massachusetts) alumni
Medalists at the 1984 Summer Olympics
Olympic gold medalists for the United States in wrestling